Keelung E-Square is a shopping center in Ren-ai District, Keelung, Taiwan that originally opened in October 2003 with the name Heping Plaza. In November 2016, the building was rebuilt to increase floor area and reopened on February 14, 2018 as Keelung E-Square. On November 11, 2019, the results of the Taiwan Architecture Awards were announced. Keelung E-Square won the first prize out of 177 entries.

Gallery

See also
 List of tourist attractions in Taiwan

References

External links

2003 establishments in Taiwan
Shopping malls in Taiwan
Shopping malls established in 2003
Buildings and structures in Keelung